Luke Theodore Upshure (1885–1969) was a musician, composer, and music teacher who lived in New York's Greenwich Village. The son of a former slave, he received musical training at the Institute of Musical Art, a forerunner of the Juilliard School, as well as formal education at Columbia University, City College of New York, and the Rand School of Social Science. Although he earned his living doing menial jobs, music was his real vocation. He performed on and taught piano and composed for that instrument, voice, and orchestra. Believing in cultural attainment as an antidote to the social evils of his time, he hosted colorblind parties for artists, actors, musicians, and writers that featured readings, performances, and political discussion as well as dancing, food, and drink. Artists of his time captured his likeness in paintings and sculptures and one contemporary author has described him as a famous African-American entertainer.

Early life and education

Upshure was the youngest of three children born to Luke Upshure and Elizabeth West Upshure. He attended DeWitt Clinton High School while it was still new and subsequently continued to live with his mother on Cornelia Street while working as a porter in a retail store. In 1915, when he was 29, he began taking voice lessons in classes at the Institute of Musical Art, a school that was organized by the prominent educator and choral conductor Frank Damrosch, and he continued there part-time until 1921. A year later he registered as a student at Columbia University and studied there, specializing in Sociology, until the spring of 1918. Over the next two years he studied economics, philosophy, and literature at City College of New York and from 1921 to 1923 took the general course at the Rand School of Social Science. While he was studying music and traditional academic subjects Upshure continued to work in menial jobs as porter or caretaker. When he completed formal studies Upshure was 37 years old.

Locale

Upshure's reported home addresses were all within a few blocks of Washington Square in Greenwich Village. Beginning in the middle of the nineteenth century, the district increasingly attracted a diverse mix of residents, including both wealthy and indigent families as well as a growing population of artists, writers, and other creative individuals. Until about 1900, the section below Washington Square was dominated first by African Americans and later by Italian immigrants living in tenement houses and poorly-maintained frame buildings while the northern section consisted mainly of fine single-family townhouses and upscale apartments. During the twentieth century Greenwich Village grew into what one writer calls "a vibrant community of working-class immigrants and artists" known for "intense cultural exchange and creativity," progressive politics, and acceptance of cultural attitudes that were elsewhere stigmatized as "bohemian."

In 1900 Upshure lived with his mother Elizabeth and his sister Marselina in a district that had become known as "Little Africa." Their home was an apartment in the rear part of a crowded brick tenement at 11 Cornelia Street. Upshure's mother, then 43, and his sister, aged 16, worked as laundresses, while Upshure, 14, was a doorman. By 1910 he and his mother had moved to a neighboring and similar building at 15 Cornelia Street. She was still a laundress and he a porter in a retail store. Five years later Upshure and his mother were living across the street in a relatively small wood frame house at 16 Cornelia Street. They continued to live there until Elizabeth Upshure died in 1924. In 1915 he was working as a porter and she continued as a laundress. That year Upshure enrolled at Columbia College and tried to find a part-time evening job to help pay expenses while he was in daytime classes. In 1924 the building in which Upshure and his mother were living was sold. The following year he gave his address as 10 West 8th Street. That address was the location of the Whitney Studio Club, an attached pair of town houses that Gertrude Vanderbilt Whitney, with her assistant, Juliana Force had remodeled into a studio-gallery. Upshure's friend, the African American painter, Beauford Delaney lived in the building a few years later and served as its janitor. At another time Upshure, too, served as a resident janitor and it can be supposed that he acted in the same role while living at the Whitney Studio Club. By 1927 he had moved to 124 Waverly Place and by 1930 to another similar place down the block at 106 Waverly Place. It was in the latter location that he lived rent-free and served as janitor. The building had seven other occupants, two lodgers and a family of five. Upshure's last known address appears on his World War II draft registration card of 1942. It shows him to be living at 647 Broadway. Because that building was entirely devoted to commerce, where there were no residential quarters, he was either using this as an address of convenience or, more likely, was living there illicitly.

Later life

During the 1930s Upshure was known for the parties he hosted. In an invitation to a party held May 6, 1934, Upshure wrote: "Please, come rest, meditate, make merry a while among friends in an atmosphere of tranquility far removed from the chaotic muddled world with its ghastly hypocrisies and eternal stupidity. It is my desire to give you a musical feast with wholesome music, just a sip of nectar before we are hurled back to the alcoves of the unknown."

In 1927 he hosted a reception in honor of New Masses editor, Mike Gold, and playwright, Em Jo Basshe, whose play, Earth, was currently on stage at the New Playwrights Theatre on 52nd Street. A report in the Pittsburgh Courier said the entire company of the play attended the party along with Augusta Savage and "the usual Village aggregation of artists and writers." The entertainment for the evening included an exotic dancer from the Village, songs written and sung by Will Anthony Madden, and performances by members of the cast. The following week many of the same people showed up at his place, surprising him, a society reporter said, by "appearing with all the makings of a party." In August 1929 he hosted a party to honor Augusta Savage who had recently received a grant to study art in Paris. The grant was made by the philanthropist, Julius Rosenwald through the auspices of the executive secretary of the National Urban League, Eugene Kinckle Jones. Performers for the evening included the poet, Will Anthony Madden; singer, Gertrude Fayde; artist, Earle Sweeting; and Upshure himself. A news account of the event mentioned that guests included artists and writers from both races (African-American and white). 

The journalist and humorist, H. Allen Smith, included an anecdote about an aspect of Upshure's parties in his best-selling book, Low Man on a Totem Pole (Garden City, N.Y., Doubleday, Doran & Co., 1941). "Luke Theodore Upshure," he wrote, "was janitor of an apartment house on Waverly Place. He was an aging Negro with twisted, crippled hands but he was educated and something of an artist. He lived in the basement of the building where he worked and it was his custom to put aside all liquor bottles thrown out by the tenants until he had accumulated enough to sell to a junk dealer. With the money these bottles brought in Luke Theodore Upshure would then purchase liquor bottles with liquor in them and hurl a soiree." The piece continues with a description of a woman at one of Upshure's parties who makes two attempts to recite a very long poem that she had composed and another of a well-known aviator, Hubert Julian, known as the "Black Eagle."

Upshure posed as the model for two sculptures and four oil portraits. Augusta Savage made a bust of him as did Arthur Lee and his portrait was painted by the German, Walter von Ruckteschell, the Frenchman, H.L. Laussucq, the Austrian, Walter Carnelli, and an American, Mary E. Hutchinson.

During the 1930s and 1940s Upshure performed at musical events. In 1929 he appeared in a musical and literary event at the Gumby Book Studio Group and two years later in an "Art Ball" to raise money to help Gumby recover from the economic ravages of the Great Depression and from a bout of pneumonia both of which had forced him to close his bookstore and put the well-known archival collections he had assembled into storage. In 1942 he appeared at the Harlem Recreation Center in a show put on for American servicemen. In addition to Upshure, the bill included Joe Sullivan, jazz pianist and Zero Mostel, comedian and actor, both performers from the Greenwich Village nightclub, Café Society.

Parents and immediate family

Upshure's father was Luke Upshure, born about 1847 on the Eastern Shore of Maryland and died sometime before 1900. His mother was Elizabeth West Upshure, born about 1851 in Arkansas City and almost certainly born to parents who were slaves. Luke and Elizabeth were married in New York on December 11, 1880. She died in 1924. In addition to Luke Theodore, they had two children who survived infancy, Walter Eli and Marselina Elizabeth. Two others died young.

At the time of Upshure's birth his father was 33 and his mother 29. Public records show that Upshure lived with both parents and then solely with his mother until he was in his early 30s. Upshure was married to Anne McVey (1887–1982). The date of their marriage is not known and it may not have been registered. It is likely to have occurred after the death of Upshure's mother in 1924 when he was in his 40s and she in her late 30s. She was raised in Missouri by a father who was, she said, "a real radical" and, as an adult, her own social and political outlook was a decidedly radical one They met in New York where both lived in Greenwich Village and she directed plays for a living. Press accounts that mention both Upshure and McVey do not refer to them as a married couple but rather as separate individuals.

Other names

Upshure called himself and was usually called Luke Upshure but sometimes Theodore Upshure and sometimes Luke Theodore Upshure. Friends referred to him as Theo.

Notes

References

Musicians from New York City
1885 births
1969 deaths
DeWitt Clinton High School alumni